Krebskolonie is the second studio album by the heavy metal band Eisregen. It was released in 1998 on Last Episode.

Track listing
"Vorabend der Schlacht" – 6:26
"Nachtgeburt" – 1:57
"Scharlachrotes Kleid" – 5:27
"Krebskolonie" – 7:35
"Für Euch, die Ihr lebt " – 2:54
"Das kleine Leben" – 8:54
"Blass-blaue Lippen" – 4:15
"Abglanz vom Licht" – 5:37
"Futter für die Schweine" – 4:25
"Thüringen" – 4:20

Credits
 Michael "Blutkehle" Roth − vocals
 Michael "Bursche" Lenz − guitar
 Daniel "DF" Fröbing – keyboard
 Theresa "2T" Trenks – violin
 Ronny "Yantit" Fimmel − drums

Background
 Krebskolonie is called "Krabbenkolonie" by the band and several fans and is included as a bonus Live-Album in the Digi-Pack version of Bühnenblut.
 The album is indexed in Germany since 7 August 2003.

References 

1998 albums
Eisregen albums